Hole-in-the-Ground is a large maar (volcanic explosion crater) in the Fort Rock–Christmas Lake Valley basin of Lake County, central Oregon, northeast of Crater Lake, near Oregon Route 31.

The crater formed during the late Pleistocene, between 13,500 and 18,000 years ago, at which time the Fort Rock basin was a lake and the location was near the shore. Basaltic magma intruding near the surface flashed ground water to steam, which blew out overlying rock and soil, along with some juvenile material. As material slid into the hole formed, it closed the vent and the process repeated, eventually forming the huge hole.

To the west of Hole-in-the-Ground is an even bigger maar, but older and more eroded, called Big Hole.

See also
Crack in the Ground

References

Maars of Oregon
Landforms of Lake County, Oregon